Arturo Soto Rangel (March 12, 1882 – May 25, 1965) was a Mexican film, television, and stage actor. Soto was best known for appearing in over 250 Mexican films. He appeared in one American movie, The Treasure of the Sierra Madre, which won three Academy Awards and starred Humphrey Bogart, Walter Huston, Tim Holt, Bruce Bennett, and many other successful actors. Soto last appeared on television in 1963, where he starred in Voy de gallo.

Early life
Soto was the only son of Don José Nemesio de Jesús Soto Ornelas born on October 30, 1852, in Ciudad Manuel Doblado, Guanajuato, México, and of a lady whose last name was Rangel. His mother died giving birth and was a widow from a previous marriage. Soto's stepmother was Doña María de la Luz Gordoa Montes de Oca born in León, Guanajuato, México. Arturo had five half-siblings: Ignacio Soto Gordoa, Guadalupe Soto Gordoa, Angelina de la Luz Soto Gordoa, Maria de la Luz Soto Gordoa, and Alfonso Soto Gordoa.

Career
Soto was nominated for the 1947 Ariel Award for Best Actor in a Minor Role for his performance in the film Las Abandonadas and won the Ariel Award for the same category in 1949 for the film Maclovia.

Personal life
Soto had a son whose name is Arturo Soto Ureña. Soto died on May 25, 1965, in Mexico City, Mexico.

Selected filmography

 Los millones de Chaflán (1938) - Notario (uncredited)
 Padre de más de cuatro (1938) - Empleado del hotel
 Hombres de mar (1938) - Don Benjamin
 El capitán aventurero (1939) - Sacerdote (uncredited)
 The Coward (1939) - Doctor
 The Black Beast (1939) - Doctor
 Juntos, pero no revueltos (1939) - Juez
 Corazón de niño (1939) - Señor Crosi
 Los olvidados de Dios (1940) - Alcaide
 Odio (1940)
 El fanfarrón: ¡Aquí llegó el valentón! (1940) - Don Sabas (uncredited)
 Poor Devil (1940) - Ricardo
 ¡Que viene mi marido! (1940) - Señor juez (uncredited)
 Madre a la fuerza (1940) - Santiago
 El secreto de la monja (1940) - Cura
 Con su amable permiso (1940) - Asistente de Plácido (uncredited)
 Amor de mis amores (1940)
 El monje loco (1940)
 Al son de la marimba (1941)
 La torre de los suplicios (1941)
 El insurgente (1941)
 Neither Blood nor Sand (1941) - Juez
 El rápido de las 9.15 (1941) - Papá de novia (uncredited)
 Lo que el viento trajo (1941) - Comisario
 Amor chinaco (1941)
 The Unknown Policeman (1941) - Doctor (uncredited)
 ¡Ay Jalisco, no te rajes! (1941) - Sr. Salas
 El barbero prodigioso (1942) - Señor cura
 Allá en el bajio (1942) - Pancho (uncredited)
 Regalo de reyes (1942) - (uncredited)
 Jesús de Nazareth (1942) - Sacerdote
 Seda, sangre y sol (1942) - Don Manuel
 El conde de Montecristo (1942) - (uncredited)
 La abuelita (1942) - Doctor Bernal
 Águila roja (1942) - Fernando Ontiveros
 Simón Bolívar (1942) - Marqués y Coronel del Toro
 La isla de la pasión (1942) - (uncredited)
 The Eternal Secret (1942) - Coronel (uncredited)
 Historia de un gran amor (1942) - (uncredited)
 La Vírgen morena (1942) - Tío Bernardino
 Beautiful Michoacán (1943) - Licenciado
 La feria de las flores (1943) - Cajero de Dionisio (uncredited)
 La vírgen roja (1943)
 Morenita clara (1943) - Don Juan, abuelo
 El padre Morelos (1943)
 Resurrection (1943)
 Tierra de pasiones (1943) - Leoncio Vicencio
 Noches de ronda (1943) - Doctor
 ¡Arriba las mujeres! (1943) - Juez Leobardo
 De Nueva York a Huipanguillo (1943)
 Los miserables (1943) - Monsignor Bienvenido Myriel
 Doña Bárbara (1943) - Coronel Pernalete
 El ametralladora (1943) - Sr. Salas
 El rayo del sur (1943) - Leonardo Bravo
 Mexicanos, al grito de guerra (1943) - Sandoval, Papá de Luis
 Cuando habla el corazón (1943) - Don Rafael
 San Francisco de Asís (1944)
 María Candelaria (1944) - Doctor (uncredited)
 ¡Viva mi desgracia! (1944) - Don Marcial
 Caminito alegre (1944) - Don Gastón
 La vida inútil de Pito Pérez (1944) - Señor cura
 Viejo nido (1944)
 La mujer sin cabeza (1944)
 La pequeña madrecita (1944)
 El amor de los amores (1944)
 El médico de las locas (1944) - Pedro
 Lady Windermere's Fan (1944) - Parker
 Cuando escuches este vals (1944)
 Porfirio Díaz (1944)
 La trepadora (1944) - Padre Jaramillo
 Amores de ayer (1944) - (uncredited)
 El mexicano (1944)
 Alma de bronce (1944)
 Amok (1944) - Don Eduardo
 Cadetes de la naval (1945) - Indalecio Perez
 Las Abandonadas (1945) - Director colegio
 Tuya en cuerpo y alma (1945) - Obispo de Worcester
 'Como México no hay dos'! (1945)
 Corazones de México (1945)
 La señora de enfrente (1945) - Padre Juan
 Canaima (1945) - Manuel Ladera
 Bugambilia (1945) - Señor cura
 Rosa del Caribe (1946)
 Cantaclaro (1946) - Don Aquilino
 Dizziness (1946) - Padre Moncada
 La devoradora (1946) - Don Manuel Ortega
 El puente del castigo (1946)
 La morena de mi copla (1946)
 Everybody's Woman (1946) - General
 María Magdalena: Pecadora de Magdala (1946) - Joseph
 Su última aventura (1946) - Don Sebastián
 La reina del trópico (1946) - Don Anselmo Gómez
 Los buitres sobre el tejado (1946)
 Guadalajara pues (1946) - Don Atilano
 Enamorada (1946) - Juez (uncredited)
 Fantasía ranchera (1947)
 Yo maté a Rosita Alvírez (1947) - Don Rosendo
 El príncipe del desierto (1947)
 Los cristeros (1947) - Don Ramón Bermúdez
 I Am Your Father (1948) - Don Victorio Fernández
 The Treasure of the Sierra Madre (1948) - El Presidente
 Río Escondido (1948) - Maestro Monroy
 El muchacho alegre (1948) - don Antonio
 Si Adelita se fuera con otro (1948) - Don José Maldonado
 Courtesan (1948)
 El último chinaco (1948) - Padre Ignacio
 A la sombra del puente (1948)
 Adventure in the Night (1948) - Capitán de policía
 Algo flota sobre el agua (1948) - Sabio
 Maclovia (1948) - Don Justo, maestro
 ¡Ay, Palillo, no te rajes! (1948) - Profesor Atenogenes
 La norteña de mis amores (1948)
 Solo Veracruz es bello (1949)
 Dicen que soy mujeriego (1949) - Señor cura
 La vorágine (1949)
 Eterna agonía (1949) - Don Pio
 Cuando baja la marea (1949)
 The Big Steal (1949) - Pedro (uncredited)
 Pueblerina (1949) - Priest
 Dos almas en el mundo (1949) - Dueño de cartera
 El hijo del bandido (1949)
 El embajador (1949)
 Tierra muerta (1949)
 La venenosa (1949) - Dr. Koll
 Rondalla (1949) - Pedro
 Rincón brujo (1949) - Don Pedro
 El seminarista (1949) - Don Pancho
 The Woman of the Port (1949) - Don Antonio Méndez
 Duelo en las montañas (1950)
 Love for Love (1950) - Don Federico
 Tú, solo tú (1950) - Don Ricardo
 La casa chica (1950) - Dr. Carrasco
 Sangre torera (1950)
 Matrimonio y mortaja (1950) - Doctor (uncredited)
 Nuestras vidas (1950) - Don Andrés
 Yo también soy de Jalisco (1950)
 La edad peligrosa (1950) - Anciano borracho
 Curvas peligrosas (1950)
 La fe en Dios (1950) - Doctor
 Primero soy mexicano (1950) - Don Matías, señor cura
 La ciudad perdida (1950)
 Un día de vida (1950)
 El Cristo de mi Cabecera (1951) - Padre Cruz
 Víctimas del Pecado (1951) - Director de prisión
 La reina del mambo (1951)
 ¡... Y murío por nosotros! (1951) - Don Júlio, patrón
 Desired (1951) - Don Anselmo
 Los pobres siempre van al cielo (1951) - Director del reformatorio
 Vivillo desde chiquillo (1951) - Juez
 Amor a la vida (1951) - Presidente Juan Vicente Gómez
 Camino del infierno (1951) - Dr. Fausto
 My General's Women (1951) - Don Jelipe
 Monte de piedad (1951) - Padre Gabriel
 Maria Islands (1951) - Miguel
 Amar fué su pecado (1951)
 Radio Patrulla (1951)
 El infierno de los pobres (1951)
 Oh Darling! Look What You've Done! (1951) - don Manuel, padre de Margarita
 Con todo el corazón (1952) - Regulo
 Siempre tuya (1952)
 Hay un niño en su futuro (1952)
 Dos caras tiene el destino (1952) - Chiclero anciano
 Mi esposa y la otra (1952) - Hermenegildo Martínez - padre de Cristina
 Yo soy Mexicano de acá de este lado (1952) - Don Roque Posadas
 A Place Near Heaven (1952) - Don Tenen
 Now I Am Rich (1952) - Zapatero
 La mentira (1952)
 Cuando levanta la niebla (1952) - Tío Carlos
 Acuérdate de vivir (1953) - Juez (uncredited)
 Las Tres perfectas casadas (1953) - Francisco
 Sombrero (1953) - Professor
 El lunar de la familia (1953) - (uncredited)
 La extraña pasajera (1953) - Auditor Camacho
 El fantasma se enamora  (1953)
 Los dineros del diablo (1953) - Don Teodoro
 Anxiety (1953) - Don Lorenzo
 Dos tipos de cuidado (1953) - Doctor
 Reportaje (1953) - Police secretary who draws naked women
 The Proud and the Beautiful (1953) - Priest
 Garden of Evil (1954) - Priest (uncredited)
 The White Rose (1954) - José María Izaguirre
 La sobrina del señor cura (1954) - Don Ramón
 La entrega (1954) - Doctor Silva
 Ofrenda (1954)
 Un minuto de bondad (1954) - Padre Anselmo
 Si volvieras a mi (1954) - Papá de Alejandra
 Me perderé contigo (1954)
 Sindicato de telemirones (1954) - don Mateo
 El hombre inquieto (1954) - Don Fausto
 Los aventureros (1954)
 Cuidado con el amor (1954) - Don Hilario
 Cain y Abel (1954) - Don Sebastián
 ¡Vaya tipos! (1955)
 Pecado mortal (1955) - Benito
 Frente al pecado de ayer (1955) - Don Eleuterio, abuelo de Lucecita
 El asesino X (1955) - Padre Juan
 Magdalena (1955) - Maestro de música
 El plagiario (1955)
 La barranca de la muerte (1955)
 El gavilán vengador (1955)
 Una movida chueca (1956) - Doctor
 Historia de un amor (1956) - Señor juez
 Ultraje al amor (1956) - Sacerdote
 El vividor (1956) - Don Benigno
 Besos prohibidos (1956) - Director del penal
 Living Full Out (1956) - Señor cura
 La adúltera (1956) - Juez
 Nos veremos en el cielo (1954)
 El Ratón (1957) - Don Lauro
 Amor del bueno (1957) - don Francisco
 Pablo and Carolina (1957) - Señor Pablo Garza
 La pantera negra (1957) - Don Macario Rosales
 Pepito as del volante (1957) - Pancho
 El caudillo (1957) - Huascapili / Abuelo chon
 Horas de agonía (1958)
 La cama de piedra (1958) - (uncredited)
 Aquí está Heraclio Bernal (1958) - Chuy Bernal
 Cuando Mexico canta (1958) - Señor cura
 Escuela de rateros (1958) - Banquero (uncredited)
 El potro salvaje (1958) - Don Matías
 Una cita de amor (1958) - Sacerdote
 Las tres pelonas (1958) - Don Fernando
 El rayo de Sinaloa (La venganza de Heraclio Bernal) (1958) - Chuy Bernal
 Música de siempre (1958)
 Ash Wednesday (1958) - Notario
 La marca del cuervo (1958)
 Una golfa (1958) - Señor cura
 El jinete negro (1958) - Don Manuel Spindola, notario (uncredited)
 Tres lecciones de amor (1959) - Señor juez
 Pistolas de oro (1959)
 Kermesse (1959) - Señor cura
 El zarco (1959) - Sacerdote
 Acapulqueña (1959)
 El sordo (1959) - Don Moisés
 El que con niños se acuesta.. (1959) - Invitado a hospicio (uncredited)
 El gran pillo (1960) - Comisario (uncredited)
 Los tigres del ring (1960)
 The Miracle Roses (1960) - Bernardino
 Rebel Without a House (1960) - Señor juez
 El tesoro de Chucho el Roto (1960) - Don Pedro
 Las cuatro milpas (1960) - Don Javier
 Herencia trágica (1960) - Notario (uncredited)
 La sombra del caudillo (1960) - Director de la Cooperativa
 Por ti aprendí a querer (1960)
 ¡Qué bonito amor! (1960)
 Revolver en guardia (1960)
 Una pasión me domina (1961) - Abuelo
 El tiro de gracia (1961) - Huascapili / abuelo Chon
 Vámonos para la feria (1961)
 Duelo indio (1961) - Huascapili / abuelo Chon
 Enterrado vivo (1961) - Huascapili / abuelo Chon
 Aventuras del látigo negro (1961)
 El jinete negro (1961) - Don Mateo, juez
 Los encapuchados del infierno (1962) - Señor cura
 El Zorro vengador (1962)
 La venganza del resucitado (1962)
 El látigo negro contra los farsantes (1962) - Don Hermenegildo
 Atrás de las nubes (1962) - Sacerdote (uncredited)
 La barranca sangrienta (1962) - Señor cura
 Voy de gallo (1963)
 La sombra blanca (1963) - (final film role)

Awards and nominations
 1947 Ariel Award for Best Actor in a Minor Role for Las Abandonadas: Nominated
 1949 Ariel Award for Best Actor in a Minor Role for Maclovia: Won

References

External links
 

1882 births
1965 deaths
Mexican male film actors
Mexican male television actors
Mexican male stage actors
People from León, Guanajuato
Male actors from Guanajuato
Male actors from Mexico City
20th-century Mexican male actors